Coby Carrozza (born May 7, 2001) is an American swimmer for the University of Texas Longhorns men's swimming team. He is currently scheduled to swim the 2022 World Aquatics Championships in the men's  free relay for the United States of America team for Worlds.

Career

2019 
On January 27, 2019, Carrozza would announce his commitment to the University of Texas.

2022 
At Trials, Carrozza managed to qualify for the men's 200m freestyle, earning the 18th seed in the event. In it, he would manage a fifth-place finish, earning a spot on the United States' relay team for the  relay team.

Personal life 
Carrozza has two older siblings; Quinn, his sister, and Crayton, his brother. Carrozza's father, Paul, is the head coach at St. Stephen's Episcopal School, the high school Carrozza graduated from in 2019.

References 

2001 births
Living people
American male freestyle swimmers
Sportspeople from Austin, Texas
World Aquatics Championships medalists in swimming